LaSalle Harper (born May 16, 1967) is a former American football linebacker. He played for the New York Giants and Chicago Bears in 1989.

References

1967 births
Living people
American football linebackers
Arkansas Razorbacks football players
New York Giants players
Chicago Bears players